Ruud Sesink Clee (24 July 1931 – 31 July 2015) was a Dutch rower. He competed in the men's coxless four event at the 1952 Summer Olympics.

References

External links
 

1931 births
2015 deaths
Dutch male rowers
Olympic rowers of the Netherlands
Rowers at the 1952 Summer Olympics
Sportspeople from The Hague